American Trading & Production Corporationwas an American shipping company founded in New York City. American Trading & Production Corporation operated tanker ships and a few cargo ships.

During World War II American Trading & Production Corporation operated Merchant navy ships for the United States Shipping Board. During World War II American Trading & Production Corporation was active with charter shipping with the Maritime Commission and War Shipping Administration. American Trading & Production Corporation operated Liberty ships and tankers for the merchant navy. The ship was run by its American Trading & Production Corporation crew and the US Navy supplied United States Navy Armed Guards to man the deck guns and radio.

In 1972 American Trading & Production Corporation founded a subsidiary, American Trading Transportation Co. Inc. with a fleet of six ships. An American Trading Transportation Co. Inc., 82,030-ton American Trader ship spilled 300,000 gallons of oil in 1990 off Huntington Beach, California. In 1986 American Trader collided with the tanker HJ Haynes in Long Beach.

In 2012 American Trading & Production Corporation became part of Tema Oil and Gas LLC of Houston, Texas. Tema Oil and Gas LLC products are: crude Petroleum, natural gas production and Oil and gas exploration

Ships
Post War T2 Tankers:
 Diamond Island
 Fisher's Hill
 Point Pleasant  * 
 Pit River * 
 Marne   
 Rum River   * 
 Harpers Ferry  –  later called Crown Trader  
 Port Republic 
 Buena Vista Hills  
 San Juan Hill * 
 Carnifax Ferry * 
 Chatterton Hill * 
 Mobile Bay 
American Trading Transportation Co. Inc.: partial list of ships:
Pennsylvania Trader
Baltimore Trader
American Trader
American Trader (I), sank 1940
Liberty ships:
 Albert J. Berres  * 
 Alfred L. Baxley 
 Anson Jones  
World War II only ship
Liberty ship:
 Albert G. Brown  LibshipsA

See also
World War II United States Merchant Navy

References

External links
 The T2 Tanker page
 T-tanker list

American companies established in 1939
History of the San Francisco Bay Area
Transport companies established in 1939
Defunct shipping companies of the United States